Joseph Chambers McKibbin (May 14, 1824 – July 1, 1896) was an American lawyer, Civil War veteran, and California Democratic politician who served one term in the United States House of Representatives from 1857 to 1859.

Early life and career 
McKibbin was born 1824 in Chambersburg, Pennsylvania. One of his brothers was David B. McKibbin.

He received a common-school education then attended Princeton College 1840–1842.
He moved to California in 1849 during the California Gold Rush, settling in Sierra County.
He studied law and was admitted to the bar in 1852, practicing in Downieville.

Political career
McKibbin was a member of the California State Senate in 1852 and 1853,
then elected as a Democrat to the 35th Congress, and served during from 1857 to 1859. He lost his bid for re-election in 1858.

Civil War
During the Civil War McKibbin enlisted in the Union Army in 1861 and was one of the first six Cavalry officers appointed by President Abraham Lincoln.
He served as a colonel and aide-de-camp on the staffs of Major General Henry W. Halleck and Major General George H. Thomas.

Later career and death 

After the Civil War, McKibbon settled in Washington, D.C. as a general contractor.
He purchased the property at Marshall Hall, Maryland, in 1883.

McKibbin died on July 1, 1896 in Marshall Hall, Maryland and is buried in Arlington National Cemetery.

External links

1824 births
1896 deaths
Democratic Party members of the United States House of Representatives from California
Democratic Party California state senators
People from Downieville, California
People from Charles County, Maryland
People from Chambersburg, Pennsylvania
People of the California Gold Rush
People of California in the American Civil War
California lawyers
Burials at Arlington National Cemetery
Union Army colonels
Princeton University alumni
19th-century American politicians
19th-century American lawyers
Military personnel from Pennsylvania